The Dalkey Book Festival is an annual literature festival held in Dalkey, County Dublin, Ireland, for four days in June. Since its inception in 2010, the festival has been held at a variety of venues in Dalkey, including Dalkey Castle, the local Town Hall, the Masonic Lodge, both churches, the local primary school, the medieval graveyard (where an Edgar Allan Poe adaptation was performed at midnight) and at various local cafes, bars and hostelries of the town. The compact nature of the town, its historic architecture and its location prompted the BBC's foreign correspondent John Simpson to call Dalkey "the loveliest little seaside town on Earth."

Although the festival started with a literary focus, it celebrates the arts in general, including theatre, film and comedy. It is also a festival of ideas, exploring the worlds of science, technology, current affairs, new politics and global trends.

The 2012 festival included writers Seamus Heaney, Joseph O'Connor, Maeve Binchy, Kevin Barry, Eoin MacNamee and Jennifer Johnston, historian Diarmuid Ferriter, comedians Barry Murphy, Gerry Stembridge and Pauline McLynn, and general speakers Declan Kiberd and Sinead Cusack.

The 2013 festival included writers Edna O'Brien, Anne Enright, Frank McGuinness, Donal Ryan, John Boyne, Eoin Colfer, Oisin McGann, comedians Colm O'Regan and Gary Cooke, and general speakers Carl Bernstein, Robert Fisk, Mike Scott and Dawn O'Porter.

The 2014 festival included writers Salman Rushdie,  Amos Oz, Sebastian Barry, John Banville, Martina Devlin, Declan Hughes, comedians David O'Doherty, Eleanor Tiernan and Apres Match, actor Eamonn Morrissey, broadcasters Kirsty Wark, Andrea Catherwood, Sinéad Gleeson and Olivia O'Leary and general speakers Rory Sutherland, Bruce Katz, Gary Jermyn and Mark Blyth.

The Dalkey Literary Awards
In 2020, the inaugural Dalkey Literary Awards were announced in advance of the festival of that year. The awards were in conjunction with the festivals long-standing sponsor; Zurich Ireland.

There were prizes for Novel of the year and for the best emerging writer. The prize fund for the inaugural competition totalled at €30,000.

The judging panel included Northern Irish journalist Andrea Catherwood, theatre director Fiach Mac Conghail, The Irish Times columnist and features writer; Jennifer O’Connell, broadcaster Rick O'Shea, author Caoilinn Hughes and Poet Gary Jermyn.

References

External links
The Dalkey Book Festival

Book Festival
Literary festivals in Ireland
Summer events in the Republic of Ireland